"Gravity" is a song by English rock band Embrace, released as the lead single from their fourth studio album, Out of Nothing (2004). Written by Coldplay, the song was first performed live by Coldplay in 2002. Ultimately, Coldplay frontman Chris Martin gave the song to Embrace, although Coldplay released their own version in 2005 as a B-side to their single "Talk". "Gravity" peaked at number seven on the UK Singles Chart and earned a silver sales certification from the British Phonographic Industry in October 2019. The B-side, "Wasted", started off as "Logical Love Song" and was originally conceived during the Drawn from Memory sessions.
 
"Gravity" later became the theme song to the TV show Mike Bassett: Manager, starring Ricky Tomlinson. The song was also used in series 2 episode 7 of Gavin & Stacey when Nessa was giving birth to "Neil the Baby".

Track listings
UK CD1
 "Gravity" – 4:39
 "The Shot's Still Ringing" – 3:39
 "Waterfall" – 5:04
 "Gravity" (video)

UK CD2
 "Gravity" – 4:39
 "Too Many Times" – 3:59

UK limited-edition 7-inch red vinyl
A. "Gravity" – 4:39
B. "Wasted" – 4:24

Charts

Weekly charts

Year-end charts

Certifications

References

2002 songs
2004 singles
Coldplay songs
Embrace (English band) songs
Independiente (record label) singles
Songs written by Chris Martin
Songs written by Guy Berryman
Songs written by Jonny Buckland
Songs written by Will Champion